The 2000 United States Senate election in Washington was held on November 7, 2000. Incumbent Republican U.S. Senator Slade Gorton was seeking reelection to a third consecutive term, and his fourth overall, but he was unseated for a second time by a very narrow margin (the first time being in 1986) by former Congresswoman Maria Cantwell. The race was the most expensive contest in the state's history at the time.

By a margin of 0.09%, this election was the closest race of the 2000 Senate election cycle. Cantwell's victory was credited to her strength in the Puget Sound suburbs of Seattle, where she performed well. The campaign proved an expensive affair, with Cantwell spending almost $10 million of her own money she made at RealNetworks on her campaign.

Blanket primary

Democratic 
 Maria Cantwell, former U.S. Representative from Washington's 1st congressional district
 Deborah Senn, Washington Insurance Commissioner
 Barbara Lampet, retired nurse, longtime Democratic PCO, and perennial candidate.
Two major Democratic candidates entered the Senate race: Cantwell, a former member of Congress, and Senn, Washington's insurance commissioner. Cantwell was generally considered the more moderate of the two, and touted her private sector success in Seattle's booming technology industry. Senn was considered as a populist, and campaigned as a staunch critic of the insurance industry.

Republican 
 Slade Gorton, incumbent U.S. Senator
 Warren E. Hanson, commercial fisherman

Libertarian 
 Jeff Jared, attorney

Polling
{| class="wikitable" style="font-size:90%;text-align:center;"
|- valign=bottom
! Poll source
! Date(s)administered
! Samplesize
! Marginof error
! style="width:100px;"| SladeGorton (R)
! style="width:100px;"| MariaCantwell (D)
! style="width:100px;"| DeborahSenn (D)
! Other/Undecided
|-
|style="text-align:left;"|Elway Poll
|July 2000
|400 (RV)
|–
||42%
||21%
|12%
|25%

Results

General election 
In the general election, Cantwell campaigned as a modern candidate with experience in high tech who understood the modern economy; she accused Gorton of offering "19th-century solutions to 21st-century problems". Gorton criticized Cantwell for spending millions on her own campaign, arguing she was trying to buy her way into the Senate.

Candidates 
 Maria Cantwell (D), former U.S Representative from WA-01
 Slade Gorton (R), incumbent U.S. Senator

Debates 
Complete video of debate, October 30, 2000

Polling

Results 
The victor of the race was at first unclear due to the amount of absentee ballots; the certified count on November 22 reported that Cantwell was ahead by 1,953 votes. Following the recount, Cantwell was certified the winner of the election by 2,229 votes out of more than 2.4 million. Cantwell carried only five of the state's 39 counties, but won King County (home to Seattle) by more than a 150,000-vote margin. The result was the second loss in Gorton's political career, after he lost re-election to a second Senate term in 1986.

Approximately 26,000 ballots were rejected during the recount for various issues.

Aftermath
After her victory, Cantwell announced that there was only "One Washington"; she also said she would work to make sure the entire state benefited from the Puget Sound region's prosperity, and that each year she would visit each of the state's 39 counties, interpreted as a gesture to the counties which she had lost. Her victory meant that both of Washington's senators were female (the other being Patty Murray); it was at that time one of three states to hold the distinction, along with California and Maine. Cantwell also became the thirteenth woman to serve in the Senate at the same time. 

Cantwell's election also meant that Democrats and Republicans would have a 50–50 tie in the Senate. At the time the race was called, it was still unclear whether Dick Cheney or Joe Lieberman would be Vice President and thus cast the tie-breaking vote. At the time, it was noted that if the Gore-Lieberman ticket were victorious, then Connecticut's Republican governor would appoint Senator Lieberman's replacement, thereby giving Republicans a majority in the chamber; if the Bush-Cheney ticket were elected (the ultimate outcome), with Cantwell the winner of her race, there would be a tie in the chamber.

In a January 2002 appearance on C-Span's Booknotes, Ralph Nader (the 2000 Green Party presidential nominee) stated that when he met with Democratic Senator Harry Reid after the election, Reid had credited his candidacy with aiding Cantwell's victory; Nader had received 103,000 votes in the state, and since the party didn't run a Senate candidate, his supporters backed Cantwell down the ballot.

See also 
 2000 United States presidential election in Washington (state)
 2000 United States Senate elections

Notes

References 

2000
Washington
United States Senate